The president of the Canadian Space Agency is the title of the head of the Canadian Space Agency. The current president is Lisa Campbell who has been incumbent since 5 September 2020.

History 
On March 1, 1989, the Canadian Space Agency was founded. Larkin Kerwin was appointed as the first president of the Canadian Space Agency

List of presidents of the Canadian Space Agency

See also 
 Canadian Space Agency
 Minister of Innovation, Science and Industry

References 

 
Government of Canada